Johan Harry Nissinen (born 17 May, 1989) is a Swedish economist and politician of the Sweden Democrats party who was elected as a member of the Riksdag in 2014 and since 2022 has been a Member of the European Parliament.

Nissinen graduated with a bachelor's degree in economics from Linnaeus University. He served on the executive board for the Sweden Democrats in Finnveden before becoming a municipal councilor in Värnamo. During the 2014 Swedish general election, he was elected to parliament representing the Skåne Northern and Eastern constituency and served on the EU committee in parliament. Nissinen did not contest the 2022 election but instead was appointed to replace Jessica Stegrud in the European Parliament after she was elected to the Riksdag.

References 

Living people
1989 births
MEPs for Sweden 2019–2024
Sweden Democrats MEPs
Swedish economists
Members of the Riksdag from the Sweden Democrats
People from Värnamo Municipality
Linnaeus University alumni